The Individual competition at the FIS Ski Flying World Championships 2020 was held on 11 and 12 December 2020, with the qualification being held on 10 December.

Karl Geiger won the competition for the first time, with Halvor Egner Granerud winning silver and Markus Eisenbichler capturing the bronze medal.

Qualification
The training was held on 10 December 2020 at 16:00.

Results
The first two rounds were held on 11 December at 16:00 and the last two rounds on 12 December 2020 at 16:00.

References

Individual